State Route 799 (SR 799) is an east–west state highway located in the eastern portion of the U.S. state of Ohio. Continuing north from SR 799's eastern terminus is Mallarnee Road (CR 21).

SR 799 was created in the late 1940s.  This two-lane spur route was established to improve access to the Clendening Lake region.  In addition, it provides an improved route from SR 800 to the village of Deersville. SR 799 is designated as a part of the Tappan-Moravian Trail Scenic Byway.

Route description

This state highway exists entirely within the western part of Harrison County. SR 799 is not a part of the National Highway System.

SR 799 crosses small bays formed by the lake twice, and comes to an end at its intersection with CR 60 (Redeye Road) just past the lake's northernmost extent.

History
SR 799 was designated in 1949. The highway has been a spur route since its inception, following the same alignment through the Clendening Lake vicinity from that point to this very day. It has not experienced any major changes to its routing since it was established.

Major intersections

References

External links

799
Scenic byways in Ohio
Transportation in Harrison County, Ohio